St. James' Catholic Church in Dublin, Ireland is church in Dublin, Ireland, built in 1852. It and the neighbouring St. James' Church and Cemetery, Dublin are both located on St. James Street or James Street.

St. James' Church is the home of the Camino Society of Ireland, providing information on the Camino de Santiago pilgrimage. Nearby St. James's Gate has been a departure point for the Irish pilgrims since the year 1220.

See also
St James' Church, Dublin (Church of Ireland)

References

External links
Parish of St. James (Official website)

Roman Catholic churches in Dublin (city)
Churches of the Roman Catholic Archdiocese of Dublin